Dis-moi que tu m'aimes is a French film directed by Michel Boisrond, released in 1974.

Synopsis 

Two wives (one a housewife and the other a decorator) throw their husbands (businessmen Daniel Ceccaldi and Jean-Pierre Marielle) out. The men are initially delighted to return to bachelorhood. 

One man leaves the city to breed sheep in the countryside and the other finds love with another man.

Details 

 Title : Dis-moi que tu m'aimes
 Director : Michel Boisrond
 Writers : Annette Wademant and Michel Boisrond
 Cinematography : Daniel Gaudry
 Cameraman : Jean-Paul Cornu
 Editor : Renée Lichtig
 Music : Claude Bolling
 Sound : Bernard Ortion
 Produce : Gérard Beytout (co-production Franco Film - S.N.C. - Mannic Film)
 Distributor : S.N.C.
 Length : 115 minutes
 Release date : 12 December 1974

Starring 

 Mireille Darc : Victoire Danois
 Marie-José Nat : Charlotte Le Royer
 Jean-Pierre Marielle : Richard le Royer
 Daniel Ceccaldi : Bertrand Danois
 Georges Descrières : Maître Olivier
 Geneviève Fontanel : Pascaline Dorgeval
 Jean-Pierre Darras : Lucien Dorgeval
 Jean Topart
 Monique Delaroche
 Erik Colin : Charles Tabard
 Lisbeth Hummel : Christiana
 Jacqueline Fogt : la mère de Christiana

External links 

 

French comedy films
1974 films
Films directed by Michel Boisrond
1970s French films